The Star World Championship are international sailing regattas in the Star class organized by the International Star Class Yacht Racing Association sanctioned by International Sailing Federation.

American sailor Lowell North has won the most titles, with five titles between 1945 and 1973 and another seven podiums. Brazilian crew Bruno Prada won also five titles between 2007 and 2019. The most crowned skipper-crew combinations are Italian duo Agostino Straulino and Nicolò Rode and Brazilian duo Robert Scheidt and Bruno Prada, with three titles each. Bill Buchan, Jr. has three titles, but with different crew.

American sailors have won the most championships, 55 editions, followed by Brazilian sailors, with seven titles, and sailors of Italy with six titles and Germany with five.

Several winners have family relations with each other, e.g. two time winner Mark Reynolds and 1971 winning crew James Reynolds, 1992 champion Carl Buchan and three time winner Bill Buchan, Jr., 1969 winner Pelle Pettersson and his son-in-law 1988 winner Paul Cayard, and the 1954 and 1955 winning father and son couple Carlos de Cárdenas and Carlos de Cárdenas, Jr.

The Star was an Olympic class from 1932 to 2012 with the exception of 1976, when it was substituted by the Tempest.

History
The first Star World Championships were held on Central Long Island Sound in 1923 and organised by the Bayside Yacht Club, Washington Yacht Club and Manhasset Bay Yacht Club. Eight boats fought for the trophy and the winner was the yacht Taurus with William Inslee and Robert Nelson of Western Long Island Sound fleet.

For the first years, all the championships were held in North America and mostly American sailors participated; the first championships held outside North America were in 1939, in Kiel, Germany.

Editions

Medalists

Multiple World Champions

See also
 ISAF Sailing World Championships
 International Sailing Federation

References

External links
 Sailing competitions

 
Recurring sporting events established in 1923